The Deccan famine of 1630–1632 was a famine associated with a back-to-back crop failure. The famine happened during the reign of Mughal Emperor Shah Jahan. The famine was the result of three consecutive staple crop failures, causing plague and leading to intense hunger, disease, and displacement in the region. Famine was further intensified by the Mughal campaign led by Shah Jahan in Malwa and Deccan after Malwa's Mughal commander turned rogue and joined hands with Deccan forces of Nizam Shah and Adil Shah. About three million people died in Gujarat in the ten months ending in October 1631 while another million died around Ahmednagar. The  report gives an overall death toll of 7.4 million by late 1631, which might be for the whole region.

Account of Peter Mundy during Deccan Famine 
Peter Mundy writes his first hand account of Deccan Famine as "The Gujarat famine began with a drought in 1630, attacks on crops by mice and locusts in the following year, and then excessive rain. Famine and water-borne diseases created high mortality: 3 million died in 1631. People migrated towards less affected areas, many died on the way, and dead bodies blocked the roads. Both Persian and European sources tell the story of this famine, with a subverted cornucopoeia of grotesque consumption patterns: cattle-hide was eaten, dead men’s bones were ground with flour, cannibalism was frequent, and people fed on corpses. Carts belonging to banjaras (carriers) transporting grain from the more productive regions of Malwa were intercepted and supplies diverted to feed Shah Jahan’s royal army in Burhanpur, who were fighting territorial wars in the Deccan (southern) provinces. The pre-famine price of wheat was 1 mahmudi per man; in 1631 it had risen to 16. Imperial charitable practices of opening free kitchens and offering land revenue remission had limited effect. Gujarat was one of the main production centres for calico cloth and this trade was badly affected by the death and migration of weavers."

See also 
Bihar famine of 1966–1967
Famine in India

References

External links
FAMINES IN THE INDIAN SUBCONTINENT, from 1500 to 1767

Famines in India
1630s in India
Mughal Empire
Natural disasters in Maharashtra
17th-century natural disasters
17th century in India
1630 in India
1631 in India
1632 in India
1630 natural disasters
1631 natural disasters
1632 natural disasters
1630s natural disasters
Deccan Plateau
17th-century famines

Incidents of cannibalism